Rachael Lippincott is a New York Times bestselling American novelist. She is best known for writing the book adaptation of Five Feet Apart, published on November 20, 2018, which became a major motion picture directed by Justin Baldoni.

Early life and education 
Lippincott was born in Philadelphia, and raised in Bucks County, Pennsylvania. She graduated from George School in 2013. Lippincott originally attended the University of Pittsburgh for pre-med, before changing her major to English writing. She took a class called Writing Youth Literature taught by novelist Siobhan Vivian, which changed everything for her. She graduated in 2017.

Career 
In 2018, Lippincott wrote the novelization of Five Feet Apart from a screenplay by Mikki Daughtry and Tobias Iaconis. The book sold over a million copies and spent 60 weeks on the New York Times Bestseller List. It won Best Young Adult Fiction in the 11th Annual Goodreads Choice Awards.

In 2020, Lippincott published All This Time with Mikki Daughtry. It was a New York Times Bestseller.

Lippincott's next novel, The Lucky List, was published on June 1, 2021. It was her first solo novel.

Lippincott then co-wrote She Gets the Girl with her wife, Alyson Derrick. The story was loosely inspired by their own love story. It was a New York Times Bestseller.

Personal life 
Lippincott resides in Pennsylvania with her wife and their dog, Hank.

Bibliography
 2018 – Five Feet Apart
 2020 – All This Time
 2021 – The Lucky List
 2022 – She Gets the Girl

References 

21st-century American novelists
American women novelists
American young adult novelists
People from Bucks County, Pennsylvania
University of Pittsburgh alumni
American LGBT novelists
LGBT people from Pennsylvania
1994 births
Living people